Narmala Shewcharan is a Guyanese-born novelist and anthropologist who lives in the UK. She holds an MA and a PhD from Brunel University.

She also  trained as a journalist at the University of Guyana. She was awarded a writing fellowship by the Ragdale Foundation in Chicago and commenced work during this residency on her novel, Tomorrow is Another Day.

Tomorrow is Another Day was published in 1994 and shortlisted in that year for the Guyana Prize for Literature. The book fictionalises some of her encounters and perceptions during the turbulent 1980s period of the Burnham presidency, focusing on ordinary people's entanglement in the politics of the times and their efforts to assert their agency.

She has written two other novels. She has also written a number of plays, including Janhjat: Bola Ram and the Long Story, which was adapted for television and shown on MBC Channel 93 in Guyana, On the Wings of a Woodant and Going Berbice.

She began writing poetry and short stories at an early age and was awarded a Guyfesta Prize for her poetry. Her poems and short stories were published extensively in the Guyana Chronicle in the 1980s.

References

Further reading
 Donnell, Alison. 2006. Twentieth-Century Caribbean Literature: critical moments in Anglophone literary history. London: Routledge.
 Gafoor, Ameena. “The depiction of Indian female experience in the contemporary novel of the Anglophone Caribbean.” Guyana Chronicle, 27 April 2003.
 Johnson, Nadia Indra. 2009. "Modernizing Nationalism: Masculinity and the Performance of Anglophone Caribbean Identities". University of Miami: Open Access Dissertations.
 Muneshwar, Tanita Amanda. 2010. "(Her)stories written: The construction of identity through politics, culture and education in the novels of contemporary Indo-Guyanese women". M.A. Thesis. York University.
 Pirbhaia, Mariam. 2001. "The Question of Cultural Conviction for ‘This time generation’: The Indo-Guyanese Response to Contemporary Caribbean Experience in Rooplall Monar's Janjhat and Narmala Shewcharan's Tomorrow is Another Day". World Literature Written in English 39.1 (2001 Special Issue on Caribbean Literature): 37-53.
 Pirbhaia, Mariam. 2010. "The Jahaji-Bhain Principle: A Critical Survey of the Indo-Caribbean Woman's novel, 1990-2000". The Journal of Commonwealth Literature, 45 (1): 37.

Guyanese emigrants to England
Year of birth missing (living people)
Living people
Guyanese women novelists
Guyanese novelists
Guyanese poets
Guyanese women poets
Guyanese short story writers
Guyanese dramatists and playwrights
Guyanese women short story writers
Women dramatists and playwrights
20th-century novelists
20th-century dramatists and playwrights
20th-century poets
20th-century women writers
University of Guyana alumni
Alumni of Brunel University London
20th-century short story writers
20th-century Guyanese writers
Guyanese people of Indian descent